The Symphony No. 5 also known as the Advent Symphony is a symphony in four movements by Wojciech Kilar.

The 5th Symphony was commissioned by the Silesian Philharmonic based in Katowice. When composing, the author referred to the musical tradition of Silesia. Two melodies sung in this area during Advent were introduced to the score: Catholic Polish  and Protestant German . The theme of the liturgical cry in Latin also returns in the symphony: . The work was completed in 2007. In the first and fourth movements, the composer introduced a choir. The world premiere took place in Katowice on November 16, 2007. The orchestra of Silesian Philharmonic was conducted by Mirosław Jacek Błaszczyk.

Titles of parts of a work:
 1. Larghetto meditativo
 2. Largo religiosamente
 3. Andante solennemente
 4. Largo supplichevolmente

References

External links
Advent Symphony on YouTube, performed by Orchestra and Choir of the Silesian Philharmonic

Compositions by Wojciech Kilar
2007 compositions